Xu Yuan may refer to:
 Xu Garden, called Xu Yuan in pinyin, classical garden in Nanjing, Jiangsu, China
 Xu Yuan (general) (許遠, 709–757), general of Tang Dynasty 757 AD
 Xu Yuan (footballer) (徐媛, born 1985), female Chinese football player
 Xu Yuan (poet), female Chinese poet (fl. c. 1590), nicknamed "Xie reincarnate" in reference to Xie Daoyun, see 1590 in poetry
 Xu Yuan Zhen, Olympic sailor, see Singapore at the 2005 Southeast Asian Games